Campovassouria is a genus of flowering plants in the family Asteraceae.

 Species
Both known species are native to South America.
 Campovassouria barbosae H.Rob. - Paraná
 Campovassouria cruciata (Vell.) R.M.King & H.Rob. - Bolivia, Paraguay, Uruguay, northeastern Argentina, Brazil (Bahia, Mato Grosso do Sul, São Paulo, Rio de Janeiro, Minas Gerais, Espirito Santo, Santa Catarina, Rio Grande do Sul, Paraná)

References

Eupatorieae
Asteraceae genera
Flora of South America